Following is a list of notable architects from Estonia:

A–M

 Mattias Agabus
 Helmut Ajango 
 Arnold Alas
 Indrek Allmann
 Andres Alver
 Martin Aunin
 Dmitri Bruns
 Karl Burman, Sr. 
 Eero Endjärv
 Hanno Grossschmidt
 Eugen Habermann
 Tomomi Hayashi
 Georg Hellat 
 Jaak Huimerind
 Erich Jacoby
 Peep Jänes
 Herbert Johanson
 Velle Kadalipp
 Ott Kadarik
 Raine Karp
 Hindrek Kesler
 Tõnis Kimmel
 Andri Kirsima
 August Komendant
 Katrin Koov
 Alar Kotli
 Raivo Kotov
 Ernst Kühnert
 Vilen Künnapu
 Edgar Johan Kuusik

 Tarmo Laht 
 Tõnu Laigu
 Leonhard Lapin

 Elmar Lohk
 Marika Lõoke
 Urmas Lõoke
 Ra Luhse

 Ülar Mark

 Allan Murdmaa
 Urmas Muru
 Margit Mutso

N–Z 

 Robert Natus
 Erika Nõva
 Maarja Nummert
 Jüri Okas

Ain Padrik
 Eero Palm
 Arent Passer

 Peeter Pere

 Andres Põime

 Valve Pormeister
 Mart Port
 Uno Prii
 Raivo Puusepp
 Enn Rajasaar

 Ilmar Reepalu
 Jacques Rosenbaum
 Indrek Rünkla
 Eugen Sacharias
 Mai Šein
 Henno Sepmann
 Andres Siim
 Olev Siinmaa

 Vahur Sova
 Hilda Taba
 Elmar Tampõld
 Karl Tarvas
 Peeter Tarvas 
 Jaan Tiidemann
 Uno Tölpus
 Villem Tomiste
 Tiit Trummal
 Meeli Truu 
 Illimar Truverk
 Tanel Tuhal
 Mihkel Tüür
 Emil Urbel
 Teodor Ussisoo
 Veronika Valk
 Siiri Vallner

 Kalle Vellevoog

 August Volberg

See also

 List of architects
 List of Estonians

Estonia
Architects